The Richmond Braves were an American minor league baseball club based in Richmond, Virginia, the Triple-A International League affiliate of the Atlanta Braves from 1966 to 2008. Owned by the parent Atlanta club and colloquially referred to as the R-Braves, they played their home games at a stadium called The Diamond on Richmond's Northside built for them in 1985, and before then Parker Field on the same site.  The franchise moved to Gwinnett County, Georgia in 2009 to play in the newly built Coolray Field as the Gwinnett Braves.

The R-Braves came to Richmond in 1966 after the Braves' top affiliate, the Atlanta Crackers, moved to Virginia. The then-Milwaukee Braves had bought the Crackers as part of their planned move to Atlanta in 1965; under MLB rules of the day, they bought the Crackers in order to obtain the major league rights to Atlanta. However, an injunction forced the Braves to play a lame-duck season in Milwaukee in 1965, leaving them to operate the Crackers in Atlanta for one more season. When searching for a new home for the Crackers, they landed in Richmond, where Parker Field had been left open by the previous year's move of the Richmond Virginians, a New York Yankees affiliate that moved in 1965. 

At the time of the R-Braves' departure to Gwinnett, only the Baltimore Orioles and their Appalachian League affiliate, the Bluefield Orioles, had held a longer affiliation agreement in a single city than Atlanta/Richmond's 43 seasons. The Braves played their final game on September 1, 2008, against their long-time intrastate rivals, the Norfolk Tides. Richmond won, 9–3, in front of a sellout crowd of 12,167. After the game players and alumni threw balls and other keepsakes to fans in the stands, and fans were able to walk onto the field.

In 2010, the Double-A Eastern League's Connecticut Defenders, a San Francisco Giants affiliate (but independently owned), moved to Richmond to play as the Richmond Flying Squirrels.

Titles
The R-Braves won the Governors' Cup, the championship of the International League, five times, and played in ten championship series.

1966 – Lost to Toronto
1976 – Lost to Syracuse
1978 – Defeated Pawtucket
1981 – Lost to Columbus
1983 – Lost to Tidewater
1986 – Defeated Rochester
1989 – Defeated Syracuse
1994 – Defeated Syracuse
2004 – Lost to Buffalo
2007 – Defeated Durham; lost to Sacramento (PCL) in AAA Championship Game

Alumni

Tommie Aaron
Jim Acker
Steve Avery
Dusty Baker
Steve Barber
Howard Battle
Rob Belloir
Bruce Benedict
Wilson Betemit
Jeff Blauser
Pedro Borbón, Jr.
Joe Borowski
Jim Breazeale
Brett Butler
Francisco Cabrera
José Capellán
Vinny Castilla
Chris Chambliss
Bruce Chen
Román Colón
Bobby Cox
Kyle Davies
Mark DeRosa
Jermaine Dye
Gary Eave 
Yunel Escobar
Darrell Evans
Sal Fasano
Ron Gant
Ralph Garr
Marcus Giles
Ed Giovanola
Tom Glavine
Tony Graffanino
Tommy Greene
Wes Helms
Jason Heyward
Tom House
Tyler Houston
Glenn Hubbard
Chuck James
Kelly Johnson
Andruw Jones
Chipper Jones
Brian Jordan
David Justice
Ryan Klesko
Ryan Langerhans
Adam LaRoche
Tony La Russa
Mark Lemke
Kerry Ligtenberg
Grady Little
Javy López
Mickey Mahler
Rick Mahler
Jason Marquis
Andy Marte
Kent Mercker
Kevin Millwood
Charlie Morton
Mike Mordecai
Dale Murphy
David Nied
John Rocker
Santiago Rosario
Chico Ruiz
Deion Sanders
Jason Schmidt
Randall Simon
Pete Smith
John Smoltz
Mike Stanton
Tony Tarasco
Billy Taylor
Scott Thorman
Andy Tomberlin
Turk Wendell
Mark Wohlers
Earl Williams
Ned Yost

References

External links

1966 establishments in Virginia
2008 disestablishments in Virginia
Atlanta Braves minor league affiliates
Defunct baseball teams in Virginia
Defunct International League teams
Baseball teams established in 1966
Baseball teams disestablished in 2008
Sports in Richmond, Virginia